Charles Jean Marie Letourneau (23 September 1831, Auray – 21 February 1902, 6th arrondissement of Paris) was a 19th-century French anthropologist.

Biography 
In 1865 he joined the Society of Anthropology of Paris of which he was general secretary from 1887 until his death. He thus succeeded Paul Broca who served in this position until 1880.

Publications 
 1868: La Physiologie des passions
 1877: La biologie
 1878: Physiologie des passions
 1879: Science et matérialisme
 1880: La sociologie d'après l'ethnographie
 1882: Questions de sociologie et d'ethnographie
 1887: L'Évolution de la morale, leçons professées pendant l'hiver de 1885-1886
 1888: L'évolution du mariage et de la famille
 1894: L'évolution littéraire dans les diverses races humaines
 1895: La guerre dans les diverses races humaines
 1897: L'évolution de l'esclavage dans les diverses races humaines
 1898: L'évolution de l'éducation dans les diverses races humaines
 1898: L'évolution religieuse dans les diverses races humaines
 1901: La psychologie ethnique
 1903: La condition de la femme dans les diverses races et civilisations

References 

French anthropologists
1831 births
People from Auray
1902 deaths